Saeed Namaki is an Iranian politician and pharmacist. He is assistant professor of immunology at Shahid Beheshti University of Medical Sciences, Tehran. He served as minister of Health and Medical Education from 3 January 2019 to 25 August 2021, where he replaced Hassan Ghazizadeh Hashemi.
He had previously served as the vice-president in Plan and Budget Organization of the Islamic Republic of Iran (PBO).

COVID-19 pandemic 

During the COVID-19 pandemic in Iran, Saeed Namaki held a special parliamentary session on 25 February 2020 which included parliamentarian Ahmad Amirabadi Farahani, who had claimed a day earlier that Ministry of Health and Medical Education (MOHME) COVID-19 death statistics were vastly underestimated, with 50 deaths in Qom rather than the official count of 12 deaths in the whole of Iran. Staff testing body temperatures prior to the meeting requested Amirabadi Farahani and two other members of parliament to excuse themselves from the meeting and self-quarantine. All three declined the request and participated in the meeting with Saeed Namaki.

In February 2020 a letter was published on social media about his resignation which was declined, subsequently.

References

External links
 Official website of the Ministry of Health and Medical Education

Government ministers of Iran
1958 births
Living people
Academic staff of Shahid Beheshti University of Medical Sciences
Iranian pharmacists
Iran
21st-century Iranian politicians
Politicians from Tehran

Isfahan University of Medical Sciences alumni